The Shenyang–Dandong intercity railway, also known as the Shendan intercity railway or Shenyang–Dandong passenger railway, is a high-speed rail line within Liaoning province, connecting the cities of Shenyang and Dandong. The first public trains on the line started operating September 1, 2015.

Overview
The project was a joint venture project between the former Chinese Ministry of Railways and the Liaoning Provincial Government, jointly investing a total of 26.88 billion yuan, consisting of 24.88 billion yuan for rail construction and rolling stock acquisition costing 2 billion yuan. Works started on March 17, 2010, was completed before September 2015. After the opening of the railway the journey from Shenyang to Dandong has been shorten from 3.5 hours travel time to just over one hour.

The railway runs from Shenyang, via Benxi to Dandong. It allows for connections with the Beijing–Shenyang high-speed railway and the Harbin–Dalian high-speed railway, plus other conventional railways and other intercity rail services.

The route crosses several environmentally sensitive areas, such as the Shenyang Sujiatun District, Ma'er Mountain Biodiversity for afforestation, the Benxi Ring National Forest Park, Benxi National Geopark, Damingshan fissure ancient volcanic nature reserve, Dandong Tongyuanpu pine biomes natural five key areas of protected areas. Environmental protection is an essential and demanding part of the overall project.

Bridges and tunnels together account for 80.5% of the line length.

History

Before construction phase
 In early 2008 – The Liaoning provincial government put forward to strengthen the Liaoning coastal economic belt by constructing a railway network, officially launching the project and the project's preparatory work 
 July 2008 – The project was included by the Ministry of Railways as part of the Liaoning urban intercity railway network planning projects
 November 25, 2008 – The Liaoning Provincial Development and Reform Commission held a coordination meeting, scheduling to start construction in 2009
 January 11, 2009 – The 3rd Institute of the China Railway Group complete the preparation of pre-feasibility report and its review by the Ministry of Railways
 January 23, 2009 – The Ministry of Railways and Liaoning government report to the State Development Planning Commission on this project
 August 21, 2009 – State Development Planning Commission gives approval for the project 
 October 28, 2009 – Ministry of Land releases the pre-approved project report
 December 1, 2009 – Ministry of Environmental Protection holds a special meeting of Ministers for the consideration of the project's environmental impact report
 December 7, 2009 – National Development and Reform Commission officially approved the Shenyang–Dandong intercity railway feasibility study report

Construction phase
 March 17, 2010 – Started construction，
 July 29, 2014 – Entered the track laying phase
 September 1, 2015 – public trains operating on the line

References

High-speed railway lines in China
Rail transport in Liaoning
Standard gauge railways in China
Railway lines opened in 2015